Madarsha Union is a union parishad of Satkania Upazila in the Division of Chittagong, Bangladesh.

Geography

Madarsha Union is located in the south-western part of Satkania Upazila. The distance of this union from Upazila Sadar is about 10 kilometer. Eochia Union to the north of this union, Satkania Municipality to the east, Sonakania Union on the south and Saral Union, Bailchhari Union and Kalipur Union of Banshkhali Upazila on the west.

Kurulia's Chara is flowing over the Madarsha Union.

History
The Madarsha Union was formed in 1943 during the British rule with the two present villages of Rampur and Madarsha. At that time the chairman of the union was called the village president. During the rule of Pakistan in 1950, the post of village president was declared as the chairman of the union council. In 1954, Oshiuddin Sarkar became the first village president. Gradually Abu Noyeem Mohammad Selim Chowdhury is now Chairman of the Madarsha Union. In 2010, the then administrator separated Rampur village from Madarsha union and formed a separate union called West Dhemsha Union to facilitate administrative work.

Population
According to 2011 Bangladesh census Madarsha union total population was 38,266.
Density
1600/km  2  or 4200/mile  2 .

Administrative area 
Madarsha Union is the 7th union of Satkania Upazila. Administrative activities of this union are under Satkania Police Station. It is part of Jatiya Sangsad Constituency No. 292 of Chittagong-15. It is divided into 4 mouzas. The villages of this union are: 
 Babunagar 
 Rupnagar 
 West Madrasha 
 Middle Madarsha 
 Southern Madrasha 
 East Madrasha 
 North Madrasha

Education

Literacy rate
As of educational survey 2001, Madarsa Union Literacy rates are 48%.

Educational institutions
There are three primary schools, one high school and three madrasa.

These are:

Primary schools
 Madarsha Government Primary School
 Babunagar Government Primary school
 Hajrat Shah Fakir Maulana (Rh.) Academy

High School
 Madarsha Kholil-Sofura Adarsha High School

Madrasa
 Baitush Sharaf Adarsha Mohila Madrasha
 Hajarat Abu Huraira (Rh.) Dhakhil Madrasha
 Baitush Sharaf Adarsha Ibtedayee Madrasa

Health center
The union has following community clinics.      
 Somitighor Community Clinic
 Babunogor Community Clinic

Religious place 
There are about 30 mosques, 4 Eidgahs and 7 shrines in Madarsha Union.

Points of interest
 Play ground of Mokkar Boli Khela
 Hilly region of Madarsha Union.

Notable residents
 Abu Reza Muhammad Nezamuddin Nadwi (Member of Parliament, Bangladesh)
 A F M Khalid Hossain, Islamic scholar, researcher and writer. (born 1959)

Chairmen 
Madarsha Union current chairman is Abu Noyeem Muhammad Selim Chowdhury (2016–Present).

List of Previous Chairman of Madarsha

See also

Administrative geography of Bangladesh
Satkania Upazila
Purangor Union

References

Unions of Satkania Upazila